Turbonilla nicarasana is a species of sea snail, a marine gastropod mollusk in the family Pyramidellidae, the pyrams and their allies.

Distribution
This species occurs in the Caribbean Sea off Nicaragua.

References

External links
 To World Register of Marine Species

nicarasana
Gastropods described in 1951